The following list is a partial discography of production by Flori Mumajesi, an Albanian composer, producer, singer and songwriter, which includes music he produced and co-produced.

Selected production discography

Albanian–speaking Europe

Bulgaria

Greece

Serbia

Turkey

See also 
Flori Mumajesi discography
Flori Mumajesi videography

References 

Production discography
Production discographies
Discographies of Albanian artists